The  was a yakuza organization based in Fukuoka Prefecture on the Kyushu island of Japan, with an estimated 380 active members. Headquartered in the southern Fukuoka region of Omuta, the Kyushu Seido-kai maintains its offices in five other prefectures including Tokyo.

Since its formation, the Kyushu Seido-kai has been known for its blatant armed conflicts with its former parent syndicate, the Dojin-kai, involving various hazardous weapons such as automatic firearms (especially the AK-47), petrol bombs and hand grenades.

While violently feuding with the Dojin-kai, the Kyushu Seido-kai has caused deaths among several innocent civilians as well as numerous yakuza members, and because of that, despite being a relatively recently established group, the Kyushu Seido-kai has been a designated yakuza group since 2008.

History
The Kyushu Seido-kai launched in 2006 as the Dojin-kai's splinter group led by the Omuta-based Murakami-ikka clan, after the long-time Dojin-kai boss Seijiro Matsuo announced his resignation, sparking a war of succession. In 2007 a Dojin-kai member attempted to murder a Seido-kai member, but ended up killing an innocent bystander. The Kyushu Seido-kai ended up receiving official registration as a designated yakuza group under the Organized Crime Countermeasures Law on February 28, 2008.

In 2011, the Seido-kai's feud with the Dojin-kai escalated, and many Seido members were killed by the Dojin-kai; two Seido seniors were killed by alleged Dojin-kai's grenades in Omuta (April), one Seido member was stabbed to death in Ogi, Saga (April), and one Seido senior was shot to death in Imari, Saga (April).

Condition
The Kyushu Seido-kai is one of the five independent Fukuoka-based designated yakuza syndicates, along with the Kudo-kai, the Taishu-kai, the Fukuhaku-kai, and the Dojin-kai. The Kyushu Seido-kai maintains its offices in six prefectures; Fukuoka, Saga, Nagasaki, Kumamoto, Yamagata, and Tokyo.

In 2008, the Kudo-kai's third-generation president Hideo Mizoshita died and his funeral was attended by many yakuza magnates representing their respective syndicates from all over the country. The Seido-kai was the only designated yakuza syndicate absent from this event.

The second president Namikawa has allegedly maintained a close relationship with Kunio Inoue. Inoue is the president of the fourth-generation Yamaken-gumi, an affiliate of the largest-known Yamaguchi-gumi syndicate.

Activities
The Kyushu Seido-kai's illegal activities have allegedly included loansharking and methamphetamine trafficking.
The Seido-kai was allegedly the largest drug trading division of the Dojin-kai, as rumored by some local Omuta in-the-know men, hence the informal dub name of the "Seido Pharmacy". Even the 55-year-old founding president Murakami was arrested for methamphetamine possession.

On June 11, 2013, Kyushu Seido-kai announced the end of its gang war with Dojin-kai as well as its dissolution.

References

Organizations established in 2006
2006 establishments in Japan
Organizations disestablished in 2013
2013 disestablishments in Japan
Yakuza groups based in Kyushu
Ōmuta, Fukuoka